Little Wildrose is a Romanian fairy tale. Andrew Lang included it in The Crimson Fairy Book.

Origin
Mite Kremnitz stated that the tale was penned by Romanian author , and published in the magazine Convorbiri Literare.

Translations
Mite Kremnitz translated the tale into German as Waldröschen.

Synopsis

An old man went in search of a child, so someone would inherit his home.  In a dark wood, he found a hermit, who gave him an apple, telling him to eat half and give his wife half.  On the way home, he grew thirsty; there was no water, and he ate the whole apple.  He found a beautiful baby girl and carried her home, laying her in a pail to call his wife near his home.  An eagle carried the child off for its eaglets to eat, but they nestled up to her instead.  A lindworm came to eat them, but something killed it.  The eagle raised her with the eaglet.

One day, an emperor's son saw her.  He could not lure her down and grew sick from love.  His father asked him what was wrong and, hearing of it, sent about for word of the maiden.  An old woman promised to get them the girl.  She started to set up a fire beneath the tree and did everything wrong.  Little Wildrose tried to tell her how to do it, but she continued to do it wrong; Little Wildrose came down to show her, and the old woman carried her off.  The emperor's son married her.

Analysis

Tale type
American folklorist D. L. Ashliman classified the tale in the Aarne-Thompson Index as type AaTh 554B*, "The Child Who Was Raised by An Eagle", a tale type that is otherwise titled "The Boy in the Eagle's Nest" and features a male protagonist that is raised by an eagle.

Motifs
The child in the bird's nest is also found in "Foundling-Bird".

The method of luring the bride down from the tree is also found in "The Golden Stag".  More commonly, as in "Brother and Sister", "The Six Swans", or "Mary's Child", the hero succeeds in luring her away himself.

See also
 Calumniated Wife

References

Romanian fairy tales
ATU 500-559